Chingari is a video sharing mobile app. In these videos, users have options to add visual effects, lip-sync, dance, or voice over movie scenes and comic dialogues.

History 
Chingari was launched in Google Play Store in November 2018. It is a social entertainment application, founded by Sumit Ghosh, Biswatma Nayak, a mechanical engineer turned programmer and Deepak Salvi, a media veteran. Chingari app was rebranded and redesigned in June 2020. Through this app, users upload videos in more than 20 languages including English, Hindi, Bangla, Gujarati, Marathi, Kannada, Odia, Punjabi, Malayalam, Tamil, and Telugu.

In July 2020, many new apps like Roposo, Trell, and Chingari tried to fill the gap that TikTok’s (with 59 other Chinese apps) ban in response to  Galwan Valley border tensions with China had created . Number of downloads of the app crossed 1 million in 15 days of rebranding in July 2020, 25 million in July 2020 and 50 million in February 2021.

References

External links 

Mobile applications